Cottonwood is a census-designated place (CDP) in Shasta County, California, United States. Its population is 6,268 as of the 2020 census, up from 3,316 from the 2010 census. Cottonwood was a stagecoach town where a settlement was established in 1849. The first Post Office was opened in 1852. Cottonwood is equidistant between Redding and Red Bluff,  in either direction.

In the spring of 1997 Hollywood came to this small, quiet town to film Almost Heroes starring Matthew Perry and Chris Farley. It was Farley's last film.

In the summer of 1961, parts of  Hell Is for Heroes, starring Steve McQueen, were shot in and around Cottonwood. Bob Newhart made his debut appearance in this film.

Geography

Cottonwood is located at  (40.388953, −122.281823).

Cottonwood is located on the north and south bank of Cottonwood Creek, for which it is named.

Demographics

2010
The 2010 United States Census reported that Cottonwood had a population of 3,316. The racial makeup of Cottonwood was 2,844 (85.8%) White, 4 (0.1%) African American, 99 (3.0%) Native American, 108 (3.3%) Asian, 2 (0.1%) Pacific Islander, 120 (3.6%) from other races, and 139 (4.2%) from two or more races. Hispanic or Latino of any race were 352 persons (10.6%).

The Census reported that 3,316 people (100% of the population) lived in households, 0 (0%) lived in non-institutionalized group quarters, and 0 (0%) were institutionalized.

There were 1,200 households, out of which 500 (41.7%) had children under the age of 18 living in them, 591 (49.3%) were opposite-sex married couples living together, 200 (16.7%) had a female householder with no husband present, 102 (8.5%) had a male householder with no wife present. 240 households (20.0%) were made up of individuals, and 80 (6.7%) had someone living alone who was 65 years of age or older. The average household size was 2.76.  There were 893 families (74.4% of all households); the average family size was 3.14.

The population was spread out, with 950 people (28.6%) under the age of 18, 299 people (9.0%) aged 18 to 24, 805 people (24.3%) aged 25 to 44, 910 people (27.4%) aged 45 to 64, and 352 people (10.6%) who were 65 years of age or older.  The median age was 35.8 years. For every 100 females, there were 94.1 males.  For every 100 females age 18 and over, there were 91.1 males.

The homeowner vacancy rate was 4.3%; the rental vacancy rate was 7.7%.  2,093 people (63.1% of the population) lived in owner-occupied housing units and 1,223 people (36.9%) lived in rental housing units.

2000
As of the census of 2000, there were 2,960 people, 1,068 households, and 776 families residing in the CDP. The racial makeup of the CDP was 86.32% White, 0.24% African American, 3.21% Native American, 3.04% Asian, 0.03% Pacific Islander, 3.34% from other races, and 3.82% from two or more races. Hispanic or Latino of any race were 9.39% of the population.

There were 1,068 households, out of which 42.6% had children under the age of 18 living with them, 51.5% were married couples living together, 16.3% had a female householder with no husband present, and 27.3% were non-families. 22.0% of all households were made up of individuals, and 8.7% had someone living alone who was 65 years of age or older.  The average household size was 2.77 and the average family size was 3.22.

In the CDP, the population was spread out, with 32.1% under the age of 18, 8.7% from 18 to 24, 29.0% from 25 to 44, 19.4% from 45 to 64, and 10.8% who were 65 years of age or older.  The median age was 33 years. For every 100 females, there were 89.9 males.  For every 100 females age 18 and over, there were 87.2 males.

The median income for a household in the CDP was $30,191, and the median income for a family was $31,808. Males had a median income of $31,161 versus $20,755 for females. The per capita income for the CDP was $11,778.  About 12.0% of families and 18.3% of the population were below the poverty line, including 21.3% of those under age 18 and 3.8% of those age 65 or over.

Politics

Proposed incorporation
A number of residents in Cottonwood have expressed interest in incorporation. Not only would it allow the town to have stricter building codes, but it would stop the City of Anderson from further annexation of the surrounding areas.

Cottonwood is one of five CDPs in Shasta County that have expressed interest in incorporating. The other towns are Burney, Shingletown, Fall River Mills, and McArthur. Fall River Mills and McArthur would incorporate as one city together.

A suggestion for combining the new Sunset Hills and Sun City Tehama subdivisions across the Tehama County line with the current CDP would be currently unworkable since the California constitution prohibits incorporated cities and towns from crossing county lines.

Education
Cottonwood has one high school, one junior high school, two elementary schools.

West Valley High School (9–12), with an enrollment of approximately 900 students.
West Cottonwood Junior High School (5–8)
North Cottonwood (k–4)
Cottonwood Creek Charter (K-8) with an approximate enrollment of 250 students.

There are three elementary schools, Cottonwood Creek Charter for K-8 and North Cottonwood Elementary for 3–5 on the Shasta side, and Evergreen Elementary on the Tehama side.

There are two public middle schools, West Cottonwood Jr High on the Shasta side and Evergreen Middle on the Tehama side.
A school that was recently added as a charter school is Cottonwood Creek Charter.

Notable residents
 Norm Stephens, world-famous guitar player who played with Merle Haggard, Lefty Frizzell, and Hank Thompson, was a long-time resident.
 Tom Hubert, former NASCAR driver and current crew member for Bill Davis Racing (born in Cottonwood).
 Nicole Teter, 800 meter runner:  Three-time USA Indoor champion ('02, '03, '08);  American record holder at indoor 800m – 1:58.71; 2004 Olympic Trials runner-up; 2008 Olympic competitor; 2002 USA Outdoor Champion; 2003 U.S. Outdoor runner-up; 1991 USA Junior champion. Graduated from West Valley High School (located in Cottonwood, California).

Image gallery

References

External links

  Historical Information on Cottonwood (archive.org version of  this page).

Census-designated places in Shasta County, California
Populated places established in 1882
Census-designated places in California